Lat Mahalleh (also Romanized as Lāt Maḩalleh) is a village in Chehel Shahid Rural District, in the Central District of Ramsar County, Mazandaran Province, Iran. At the 2006 census, its population was 125, in 35 families.

References 

Populated places in Ramsar County